
Gmina Żyrzyn is a rural gmina (administrative district) in Puławy County, Lublin Voivodeship, in eastern Poland.

Villages
Gmina Żyrzyn contains the villages and settlements of Bałtów, Borysów, Cezaryn, Jaworów, Kośmin, Kotliny, Las-Grzęba, Las-Jawor, Osiny, Parafianka, Sachalin, Skrudki, Strzyżowice, Wilczanka, Wola Osińska, Zagrody, Żerdź and Żyrzyn.

Neighbouring gminas
Gmina Żyrzyn is bordered by the town of Puławy and by the gminas of Abramów, Baranów, Końskowola, Kurów, Puławy, Ryki and Ułęż.

References

Polish official population figures 2006

Zyrzyn
Puławy County